Khosrow Bagheri Noaparast (in Persian: خسرو باقری نوع پرست) is an Iranian philosopher, educational theorist and the president of Philosophy of Education Society of Iran (PESI).

Biography
Bagheri was born in 1957 in Tehran. He took his Ph.D. degree from the University of New South Wales, Australia, in 1994. He is Professor of Philosophy of Education at the University of Tehran. He has made contributions to a wide range of topics in philosophy of education, Religion and personal construct psychology; topics from different viewpoints, such as constructive realism, neo-Pragmatism, action theory, deconstruction, Hermeneutics, and Islamic philosophy of education. In 2011 he was awarded First order Medal of Research (The Distinguished Researcher) by the University of Tehran.

Philosophical views

Religious education
In his book Islamic Education he places human agency as the main educational thesis of Islam. This is while before him scholars such as Mutahari believed in human nature as the center of Islamic education. He opposes nature as a central key to Islamic education claiming that human beings are not composed of non-living matter to be fabricated into a human being. Instead a human is a dynamic creature who should choose being religious. In this regard he has introduced abstinence by presence. While most scholars have insisted that religion is about preventing sinful situations Bagheri insists that real education leads to presence in a sinful situation and yet remain intact.

Personal construct theory
He argues that in George Kelly's personal construct psychology a combination of correspondence theory of truth and a coherence theory of truth is necessary. Offering criteria for a reconciliation of correspondence and coherence theories he argues that constructivism should be based on a reality and the effort is to search for an optimal point where reality and constructs reach each other.

Religious science
Most Classic Islamic Philosophers followed or concurred with Aristotle in understanding knowledge as grasping the form of a thing. This was possible in two ways, one by divine inspiration (which might be called intuition), or by sensory apprehension. They did not question, as many philosophers do today, whether sensory information was reliable. Either of these perspectives or a combination of them has led some to conclude that a science based on religion can lead to infallible knowledge. However, Bagheri argues that a religious science is only possible through interference of religious elements in the presupposition of a theory and hence will remain a science tout court, and its religious presuppositions will not guarantee infallible knowledge.

Publications
A non-comprehensive list of Bagheri's published works include:
In English

In Persian

Translations
Bagheri has translated the following books into Persian:

References

External links

Homepage on academia.edu
Interview on Encyclopedia of Educational Philosophy and Theory
Interview in the Adirondackreview
Neo-Pragmatism in Encyclopedia of Educational Philosophy and Theory

Iranian educational theorists
Philosophers of education
University of New South Wales alumni
Academic staff of the University of Tehran
Writers from Tehran
Living people
1957 births
21st-century Iranian philosophers